Eisberg may refer to:
Eisberg (Lusatian Highlands), a mountain of Saxony, Germany
Eisberg (Moosbach), a mountain of Bavaria, Germany
Eisberg (Reiter Alpe), a mountain of Bavaria, Germany
Eisberg (Stölzinger Hills), a hill in Hesse, Germany
"Eisberg" (song), by Andreas Bourani
Eisberg, a brand of de-alcoholised wine produced by Halewood International

See also
Iceberg, a large piece of freshwater ice floating freely in open water